Indiana Jones is an American media franchise.
 Raiders of the Lost Ark, 1981 film
 Indiana Jones and the Temple of Doom, 1984 film
 Indiana Jones and the Last Crusade, 1989 film
 Indiana Jones and the Kingdom of the Crystal Skull, 2008 film
 Indiana Jones and the Dial of Destiny, upcoming film
 The Young Indiana Jones Chronicles, 1992 TV series

Indiana Jones may also refer to:

Indiana Jones (character), the title character of the media franchise
Indiana Jones (comics), comics featuring the character
Indiana Jones: The Pinball Adventure, a 1993 pinball machine featuring the character

See also
Indiana Jones and the Last Crusade (disambiguation)
Indiana Jones and the Temple of Doom (disambiguation)
Raiders of the Lost Ark (disambiguation)